Kanavinskaya is a station of the Nizhny Novgorod Metro which was opened on 20 December 1993. It is on the Sormovskaya line between Moskovskaya and Burnakovskaya.

Connections
The station has connections to tram and bus lines to Sormovsky, Moskovskaya, the city centre, and Dzerzhinsk.

See also
 List of Nizhny Novgorod metro stations

References

Nizhny Novgorod Metro stations
Railway stations in Russia opened in 1993
Railway stations located underground in Russia